Anthony V. Bouza (born 4 October 1928 in Ferrol, Spain) is a Spanish American retired police officer who served in the New York City Police Department and as police chief of the Minneapolis Police Department from 1980 to 1989.

Biography 
Born on October 4, 1928 in Ferrol, Spain, Bouza came to the United States with his family at age 9.  After graduating from Manual High School in Brooklyn and serving in the U.S. Army, Bouza worked briefly in sales in the garment industry in Manhattan. Bouza served with the New York City Police Department from 1953 to 1976, rising to the rank of Assistant Chief and Commander of the Bronx.  In 1976, Bouza was featured in the seminal TV documentary The Police Tapes. He served as Deputy Chief of the New York City Transit Police from 1977 to 1979.

He was brought to Minneapolis by Mayor Donald Fraser, who when newly elected in 1980, wanted an outsider and a reformer to head the department following a series of scandals under his predecessor. He retained Bouza for a total of three three-year terms.

Bouza had a difficult relationship with the police officers he led in Minneapolis. Within weeks of becoming chief, Bouza reduced the number of police precincts from 6 to 4 and replaced two-member squads with single-member squads in most of the city. Officers blamed the 1981 murder of police officer Richard P. Miller on switch to single-member squads. In a cost-cutting move, he also instituted a promotion freeze that affected hundreds of officers. The citizenry generally noted that Bouza was installed as an agent of change in the police department and that this was a cause of his unpopularity among the rank and file.

After stepping down as chief, Bouza served as Minnesota gaming commissioner from 1989 to 1991 and then briefly as director of the Center to Prevent Handgun Violence in Washington, D.C. In 1994, Bouza unsuccessfully sought the Democratic Farmer Labor Party nomination for Governor of Minnesota, with R.T. Rybak (who in 2001 was elected mayor of Minneapolis) as his campaign manager. He lost the nomination to John Marty.

Since retiring from policing, Bouza has testified for the defense in many trials across the country alleging police mistreatment.

Education and writing 
Bouza holds a bachelor's degree in business administration (1965) and a master's degree in public administration (1968) from Baruch University.

Bouza is author of nine books, including trade books: The Police Mystique: An Insider's Look at Cops, Crime, and the Criminal Justice System (Da Capo, 1990), A Carpet of Blue: An Ex-Cop Takes a Tough Look at America's Drug Problem (Fairview, 1991), Police Unbound: Corruption, Abuse, and Heroism by the Boys in Blue (Prometheus, 2001), The Decline and Fall of the American Empire: Corruption, Decadence, and the American Dream (Da Capo Press, 2003), and Expert Witness: Breaking the Policemen's Blue Code of Silence (2013), as well as two technical books: Police Intelligence: The Operations of an Investigative Unit (AMS Press, 1976) and Police Administration (Elsevier, 1978).

Bouza writes a monthly column for the Minneapolis community paper Southside Pride.

Personal life 
Bouza's wife, Erica Bouza, who was born in Great Britain, was arrested repeatedly for engaging in anti-militarism protests against Honeywell while Bouza was Minneapolis police chief in the 1980s. The Bouzas have two sons, Anthony Jr. and Dominick.

References

External links 

 
 
 

Chiefs of the Minneapolis Police Department
Military personnel from Minnesota
Minnesota Democrats
New York City Police Department officers
Baruch College alumni
Spanish emigrants to the United States
People from Ferrol, Spain
American people of Spanish descent
Writers from Minneapolis
Writers from New York City
1928 births
Living people